On 3 August 1979, a Constitutional Convention election was held in Zanjan Province (encompassing today's Qazvin Province) with plurality-at-large voting format in order to decide two seats for the Assembly for the Final Review of the Constitution.

The result was a victory for the two candidates supported by the Islamic Republican Party while the candidate of the Combatant Clergy Association was placed third. Members of other parties such as the Muslim People's Republic Party, the Nation Party of Iran and JAMA (the latter endorsed by the Quintuple Coalition) were defeated and the only communist who ran in the constituency received the least number of votes cast.

Results

 
 
|-
|colspan="14" style="background:#E9E9E9;"|
|-
 
 
 
 
 
 

|-
|colspan=14|
|-
|colspan=14|Source:

References

1979 elections in Iran
Zanjan Province